The Contaminated Void is the debut album by Swedish deathgrind band Coldworker. It was released on November 13, 2006 in the world (except North America).  In North America, it was released on January 23, 2007.

Track listing

References 

Coldworker albums
2006 albums
Relapse Records albums